Hjalmar Dahlberg (4 November 1886 – 5 March 1962) was a Swedish long-distance runner. He competed in the marathon at the 1912 Summer Olympics.

References

External links
 

1886 births
1962 deaths
Athletes (track and field) at the 1912 Summer Olympics
Swedish male long-distance runners
Swedish male marathon runners
Olympic athletes of Sweden
Athletes from Stockholm